Jeffrey Silverthorne was an American photographer mainly known for taking pictures of physical and psychological borders, including death and nudity. He was born in Honolulu, Hawaii in 1946, and graduated from the Rhode Island School of Design's BFA, MAT, and MFA programs.
He taught at Roger Williams University in Bristol, Rhode Island until 2018.

Publications 
 Morgue (2017)
 Jeffrey Silverthorne (Working) (2015)
 Directions for Leaving: Photographs 1971-2006 (2007)

Public Collections 
 Museum of Modern Art, New York
 Los Angeles County Museum of Art, LA
 Yale University Art Gallery, New Haven
 Museum of Fine Arts, Boston
 George Eastman House, Rochester
 Museum of Fine Arts, Houston

References

External links 
Telegraph.co.uk
Agence VU
artnet.com
PDNB Gallery, Dallas 
L'ahah, Paris
www.rencontres-arles.com

1946 births
American photographers
Roger Williams University faculty